High Flyers (aka 'The Kangaroos) is a 1937 RKO Radio Pictures musical comedy film, directed by Edward Cline and stars the comedy team Wheeler & Woolsey. (Bert Wheeler and Robert Woolsey in his final starring role).The film would be the last film the duo made, as Robert Woolsey died a year later. The supporting cast includes Margaret Dumont (who was best-known for her role as The Marx Brothers' matronly foil), Lupe Vélez, Marjorie Lord, Paul Harvey and Jack Carson.

Plot
Jeremiah "Jerry" Lane and Pierre Potkin are a couple of midway "pilots" on a carnival ride who have never actually been in the air. The duo leave their job when they are hired by smuggler Dave Hanlon to fly a real seaplane (not knowing it is a stolen police aircraft) in order to retrieve a lifesaver thrown from an ocean liner and deliver it to him. They think that the lifesaver contains news photos, but inside it they soon find cocaine, which blows in their faces and intoxicates them, and a box of stolen jewels. Jerry and Pierre eventually crash-land on the Arlington estate, owned by Horace and Martha Arlington.

Initially, the Arlingtons believe that the duo are police officers, and readily allow them to stay in their home. In a series of musical numbers, the two flirt outrageously with the Arlingtons' daughter Arlene, and their maid Juanita.

Unfortunately, the Arlingtons are good friends with Hanlon. When Hanlon is informed that Jerry and Pierre are at the Arlington estate, he convinces the family that the two men are lunatics from an asylum.  Arlene and Juanita then attempt to humor than until the "doctors" (actually Hanlon's cronies) can come and remove them.

Hanlon and the "doctors" show up at the mansion in order to "bump off" Jerry and Pierre, and get the smuggled jewels. However, like many other small items that have gone missing over the preceding weeks, the jewels have been hidden by the Arlingtons' kleptomaniac dog. A frantic and confusing search around the manor soon occurs, with dozens of cops added into the mix.

Eventually the criminals are captured, but when Horace examines the jewels he finds they are paste. However, an explanation is in the box, from the man who was carrying them on the ship: suspecting a crime was being planned, he had switched the jewels and arranged for the real ones to be sent to Arlington's office.

Cast
 Bert Wheeler as Jeremiah "Jerry" Lane
 Robert Woolsey as Pierrie Potkin
 Lupe Vélez as Juanita, the Maid
 Marjorie Lord as Arlene Arlington
 Margaret Dumont as Martha Arlington
 Jack Carson as Dave Hanlon
 Paul Harvey as Horace Arlington
 Charles Judels as Mr. Fontaine
 Lucien Prival as Mr. Panzer
 Herbert Evans as Mr. Hartley
 Herbert Clifton as Stone, The Butler
 George Irving as Chief of Police
 Stanley Blystone as Cop on Pier (uncredited)

Production
High Flyers was based on the 1926 Broadway play The Kangaroos by Victor Mapes; The Kangaroos was also the working title of the film. In February 1937, The Hollywood Reporter announced that Betty Grable was to be the film's star, but Lupe Velez, a well established comic actress, took the lead role. As in the previous Wheeler and Woolsey film, On Again-Off Again (1937), and throughout production of this film, Robert Woolsey was suffering from kidney disease. Although it occurs in the middle of High Flyers, the "I'm a Gaucho" musical number with Woolsey and Lupe Vélez would be the last scene he shot. Ultimately, this would be Wheeler and Woolsey's last film.

After Robert Woolsey's death, Bert Wheeler would continue to work regularly on the stage, and later did four more films (two features and two shorts). He would also occasionally appear on television well into the 1960s, most notably as "Smokey Joe" in the short-lived series Brave Eagle. At one point in the film, Wheeler does an impersonation of Charlie Chaplin. Wheeler's Chaplin impersonation was a part of his stage act before he teamed with Robert Woolsey, and Chaplin himself was very fond of Wheeler's impersonation of him. Lupe Velez's imitations of Dolores del Río, Shirley Temple, Marlene Dietrich and Simone Simon, were also featured.

The aircraft in the film was a Sikorsky S-39B, an  American light amphibious aircraft.

Reception
Although the film is one of the team's lesser efforts, reviewers at the time of the film's release gave Wheeler and Woolsey credit for rising above the script. Harrison's Reports: "Entertainment strictly for the Wheeler and Woolsey fans. Everyone concerned tries hard, but they cannot do much with the poor material given them." Motion Picture Herald: "Comedy that provokes laughter, even though some of it in action, situations, dialogue, and effects is quite ridiculous, is the dominating quality. As hokum is concentrated upon, High Flyers measures up as a satisfactory audience picture." Film Daily: "It is all riotous nonsense, but the comics score with some laughable gags and business, and Lupe Velez proves herself a real comedienne, and very delightful."

TV Guide in a later one-star review of High Flyers was less than kind: "A barely passable Wheeler-Woolsey effort in which the comic pair pose as flyers and find themselves in the center of a jewel-smuggling ring. When the gang of thieves take to the air, they are dim-wittedly nabbed by the amateur pilots. You've seen it all before, and for the last time with this comedy team--Woolsey died about a year after this film's release."

Notes

References

Bibliography

 Pendo, Stephen. Aviation in the Cinema. Lanham, Maryland: Scarecrow Press, 1985. .
 Wynne, H. Hugh. The Motion Picture Stunt Pilots and Hollywood's Classic Aviation Movies. Missoula, Montana: Pictorial Histories Publishing Co., 1987. .

External links
 
 
 
 

1937 films
1937 musical comedy films
American musical comedy films
RKO Pictures films
American aviation films
Films directed by Edward F. Cline
American black-and-white films
1930s American films